Notonomus philippi is a species of ground beetle in the subfamily Pterostichinae. It was described by Newman in 1842.

References

Notonomus
Beetles described in 1842